Great Run is a series of road running events around the United Kingdom, which includes the Great North Run. Great Run is a part of The Great Run Company, which was launched by retired athlete Brendan Foster. The group specialises in road running events, from a 5k up to a marathon.

Bupa was title partner of the Great Run Series for 18 years, one of Britain’s longest ever sports sponsorship agreements, which ended in 2014.
Morrisons took over sponsorship of this series of events in 2015.
In 2017, Simplyhealth became title sponsor of the Great Run series of events 

In the early 2000s, the series expanded beyond the UK and established Great Run races in the Republic of Ireland, Ethiopia and Australia.

Current list of events

Former events 
 Great Australian Run
 Great Capital Run

See also
Great Swim
Great Walks

References

External links
Official website 

Road running in the United Kingdom
Road running competitions